Tormentor is a Hungarian black metal band formed in 1986 in Budapest. They recorded their first album, Anno Domini, in 1988, but were unable to release it until the end of communism. The album reached Norway through the tape-trading community. Following the suicide of Per Ohlin, Mayhem invited Attila Csihar from Tormentor to join the band; he was to perform the vocals on De Mysteriis Dom Sathanas. Tormentor split up in 1991. After a long break they reformed and released the more experimental Recipe Ferrum through Avantgarde Music in 2001, going on a long indefinite hiatus afterwards.

Reunion
In 2017, Tormentor reunited after several years to re-emerge on the stage for a highly publicized reunion show on 21 April 2018, in Budapest, followed by an appearance at the Brutal Assault in Josefov, Czech Republic and the Beyond the Gates festival in Bergen, Norway, with later performances at festivals in France and Canada to cap off the year.

The band reunited in the classic lineup from 1988 with Csihar on vocals, Tamás Buday and Attila Szigeti sharing guitar duties, György Farkas handling bass guitar, and Machat St. Zsoltar on drums. The band's own recording imprint, Saturnus Productions, has also reissued both the cult classic debut album Anno Domini and The Seventh Day of Doom demo on CD and vinyl.

Band members

Current line-up 
 Attila Csihar – vocals (1985–1991, 1999–?, 2017–present), guitars (1989)
 Attila Szigeti – guitars (1985–1991, 2017–present), keyboards (1989)
 György Farkas – bass guitar (1987–1991, 2017–present)
Machat St. Zsoltar Motolla – drums (1988–1991, 1999–?, 2017-present), keyboards (2000)

Former members 

Lajos Fazekas– bass guitar (1985–1987)
 Márton Dubecz – drums (1985–1987)
Mugambi Zolduns Bwana – lead guitar (1999–?)
 Zénó Galóca – bass guitar (1999–?)
Tamás Buday – guitars (1985–1988, 2017–2020)

Live members 
 Charles Hedger – guitar (2020–present)

Discography 
The Seventh Day of Doom (demo, 1987)
Anno Domini (studio album, 1988; remastered, 2005)
Black and Speed Metál (split album, 1989)
Live in Hell (live album, 1999)
Live in Damnation (EP, 2000)
The Sick Years (live album, 2000)
Recipe Ferrum (studio album, 2001)

References 

Hungarian black metal musical groups
Musical groups established in 1986
Musical groups disestablished in 1991
Musical groups reestablished in 1998
Musical quartets
1986 establishments in Hungary